Alisher Dodov (born 4 August 1981) is a Tajikistani football player. He plays as goalkeeper for Regar-TadAZ Tursunzoda and for the Tajikistan national football team.

Career statistics

International

Statistics accurate as of match played 13 November 2016

References

1981 births
Living people
Tajikistan international footballers
Tajikistani footballers
Association football goalkeepers
Tajikistan Higher League players